Elva is a town in Elva Parish, Tartu County, Estonia.

Elva has two large lakes: 
Lake Verevi has a sandy and well-developed beach area that is very popular in the summer and is host to many outdoor events. Lake Arbi has wet reed grown shores. 
Elva's largest employer (and in all of southern Estonia) is Enics Eesti AS, subsidiary of Enics Group, providing electronics manufacturing services in industrial electronics. Elva has one school, Elva Gümnaasium, offering education from 1st grade to high school graduation.

A dominant element in Elva is the train station which today is a visitors' information center and which used to be an important trade route in the past centuries.

Detailed information on hikes on foot or by bicycle can be obtained from the visitors' information center. The Elva river, with old water mill sites and rapid banks, is popular for canoeing. In winter skiers can participate in the Tartu Marathon, belonging to the Worldloppet series. Its 60 km track from Otepää to Elva can be cycled through on mountain bikes in summer.

History of Elva
Elva was founded soon after the completion of Tartu-Valga train route that was built from 1886 to 1889. Elva was first mentioned in an Estonian newspaper in 1889.

Elva is named after the Elva river that has been mentioned in books already in the 17th century.

In 1913 a two grade school was opened.

On 1 May 1938 Elva became a town.

The town center was heavily damaged in the Second World War. In July 1941 Elva was liberated by the Forest Brothers. In August 1944 surroundings of Elva became a bloody battlefield between Hyazinth von Strachwitz's Panzer brigade and the Red Army.

From 1950 to 1962 Elva was District Central of Elva district. Elva's town rights were restored in 1965.

Neighborhoods of Elva
There are seven neighborhoods of Elva:
Arbimäe
Järve
Kesklinn
Kulbilohu
Mahlamäe
Moonuse
Peedu.

Notable people
Caspar Austa (born 1982), cyclist
 (1879–1964), actor and theatre director; lived in Elva
Valter Heuer (1928–2006), chess player and chess historian; was born in Elva
 (1900–1942), writer, journalist and teacher; lived in Elva 1936–1942
Martin Järveoja (born 1987), rally co-driver
Ain Kaalep (1926-2020), poet and writer; lives in Elva
Jaan Kärner (1891–1958), poet and writer; Lived in Elva 1921–1936
Kerli (born 1987), singer; was born and grew up in Elva
Tarmo Kikerpill (born 1977), basketball player; was born in Elva
Kalle Kriit (born 1983), cyclist
Urmas Kruuse (born 1965), politician; was born and lived in Elva, was the Mayor of Elva 2002–2007
 (1902–1970), painter; lived in Elva 1944–1970
Karl Muru (born 1927), literary scientist and critic; lives in Elva
Jim Ollinovski (:et) (1974–1993), poet, writer and artist; was born and lived in Elva
Hugo Raudsepp (1883–1952), playwright; lived in Elva
Erik Ruus (born 1962), actor
 (1895–1979), lexicographer
 (1902–1957), painter and poet; lived in Elva in the 1950s
Luisa Värk (born 1987), singer; was born and grew up in Elva

Twin towns – sister cities

The former municipality of Elva was twinned with:
 Kempele, Finland
 Kristinehamn, Sweden
 Salo, Finland
 Zestafoni, Georgia

Sport

Football
 FC Elva

Gallery

See also
FC Elva

References

External links

Populated places in Tartu County
Former municipalities of Estonia
Cities and towns in Estonia
1938 establishments in Estonia
Elva Parish